The Brush News-Tribune is a weekly newspaper in Brush, Colorado. It is published by Prairie Mountain Publishing, which is owned by Digital First Media.

External links

BrushNewsTribune.com (Mobile)

Newspapers published in Colorado
Morgan County, Colorado